Aurifaber (the Latinized form of the German surname "Goldschmidt" or "Goldschmied" meaning "gold smith") was a surname borne by three prominent men of the Reformation period in Germany:

Andreas Aurifaber (1514–1559), physician from Breslau, living in Königsberg
Joannes Aurifaber Vratislaviensis (1517–1568), Lutheran theologian and reformer from Breslau, brother of Andreas
Joannes Aurifaber (Vimariensis) (1519–1575), Lutheran theologian and reformer from Weimar

Variation on surname 
 Goldschmid
 Goldschmidt
 Goldschmied
 Goldschmitt
 Goldsmid
 Goldsmith